Derrick Gibson (born 1979) is an American football player.

Derrick Gibson may also refer to:

Derrick Gibson (baseball) (born 1975), American baseball player